Matas Jogėla (born July 10, 1998) is a Lithuanian professional basketball player for Neptūnas Klaipėda of the Lithuanian Basketball League (LKL) and the Champions League. A native of Tauragė, he has competed with the Lithuania under-18 team, winning a silver medal.

Professional career 
Jogėla began his career with the reserve team of Lietuvos rytas Vilnius, averaging 9.3 points, 2.0 rebounds, and 1.0 assists at the Adidas Next Generation Tournament (ANGT) in 2015–16.

In his first season with Žalgiris-2 Kaunas of the National Basketball League (NKL) in 2016–17, Jogėla averaged 5.6 points, 3.6 rebounds, and 1.1 assists per game. However, a foot injury sidelined him for a large part of the season. Next year, he was one of the team's leading players, averaging 11.5 points and 5 rebounds.

On April 10, 2018, Jogėla announced his intentions to enter the 2018 NBA draft. In August, Jogėla joined Žalgiris main team preseason camp, but was then loaned to Dzūkija Alytus for the rest of the 2018–2019 season.

On September 19, 2019, he has signed with Neptūnas Klaipėda of the Lithuanian Basketball League (LKL).

National team career 
Jogėla represented Lithuania at the 2016 FIBA Europe Under-18 Championship. He averaged 1.4 points, 1.6 rebounds, and 0.4 assists as his team claimed the silver medal.

References

External links 
Matas Jogėla at Eurobasket.com

1998 births
Living people
BC Dzūkija players
BC Neptūnas players
BC Žalgiris-2 players
Lithuanian men's basketball players
People from Tauragė
Small forwards
Shooting guards